Collinia beringensis is a species of parasitoid ciliates of the Colliniidae family. It is an endoparasite of Thysanoessa inermis, a species of krill.

References 

Oligohymenophorea
Species described in 1986
Endoparasites